The 65th Field Artillery Brigade is an artillery brigade in the United States Army National Guard. It is part of the Utah Army National Guard. The brigade was formerly called the 65th Fires Brigade, and prior to that, I Corps Artillery.

Current Structure 
 65th Field Artillery Brigade (65th FAB), Utah Army National Guard
 Headquarters Battery, Utah Army National Guard
 5th Battalion, 113th Field Artillery Regiment (5-113th FAR) (HIMARS) High Mobility Artillery Rocket System, North Carolina Army National Guard
 1st Battalion, 145th Field Artillery Regiment (1-145th FAR) (M109 A6), Utah Army National Guard
 2nd Battalion, 222nd Field Artillery Regiment (2-222nd FAR) (M109 A6), Utah Army National Guard
 340th Brigade Support Battalion (340th BSB), California Army National Guard, Ord Military Community
 190th Signal Company, Utah Army National Guard
 Battery F (Target Acquisition), 144th Field Artillery Regiment (F-144th FAR), California Army National Guard

Affiliated field artillery battalions under administrative control of other brigades:
 218th Maneuver Enhancement Brigade (218th MEB), South Carolina Army National Guard
 1st Battalion, 178th Field Artillery Regiment (1-178th FAR) (M109 A6)
 648th Maneuver Enhancement Brigade (648th MEB), Georgia Army National Guard
 1st Battalion, 214th Field Artillery Regiment (1-214th FAR) (M109 A6)

References 
http://www.ut.ngb.army.mil/html/pao/news/4oct08.html

065
FA 065
065